Ireland was represented by Colm C. T. Wilkinson, with the song "Born to Sing", at the 1978 Eurovision Song Contest, which took place on 22 April in Paris. "Born to Sing" was chosen as the Irish entry at the national final on 5 March.

Before Eurovision

National final 
The final was held at the studios of broadcaster RTÉ in Dublin, hosted by Mike Murphy. Eight songs took part, with the winner chosen by voting from ten regional juries. Other participants included future Irish representatives Sheeba (1981), and Linda Martin (1984 & 1992) who performed as a member of the group Chips.

At Eurovision 
On the night of the final Wilkinson performed first in the running order, preceding Norway. At the close of voting "Born to Sing" had picked up 86 points, placing Ireland fifth of the 20 entries. The song seemed to have a polarising effect on the various national juries, with eight placing it in their top 5 while eight others had it outside their top 10 and failed to award it any points at all. The Irish jury awarded its 12 points to Belgium.

Voting

References 

1978
Countries in the Eurovision Song Contest 1978
Eurovision
Eurovision